An analog sampled filter an electronic filter that is a hybrid between an analog and a digital filter. The input is an analog signal, and usually stored in capacitors. The time domain is discrete, however. Distinct analog samples are shifted through an array of holding capacitors as in a bucket brigade. Analog adders and amplifiers do the arithmetic in the signal domain, just as in an analog computer.

Note that these filters are subject to aliasing phenomena just like a digital filter, and anti-aliasing filters will usually be required. See .

Companies such as Linear Technology and Maxim produce integrated circuits that implement this functionality. Filters up to the 8th order may be implemented using a single chip. Some are fully configurable; some are pre-configured, usually as low-pass filters.

Due to the high filter order that can be achieved in an easy and stable manner, single chip analog sampled filters are often used for implementing anti-aliasing filters for digital filters. The analog sampled filter will in its turn need yet another anti-aliasing filter, but this can often be implemented as a simple 1st order low-pass analog filter consisting of one series resistor and one capacitor to ground.

Linear filters
Electronic circuits